The city of Windhoek, capital of South West Africa, then Namibia, was officially founded on 18 October 1890 by Curt Karl Bruno von François, an Imperial German Colonial Official in the Schutztruppe, to serve as capital of German South West Africa. Since then, the city had 49 different mayors, the first of them starting to serve in 1909.

List of Mayors

German Colonial Administration (1894–1915)
 1909–1910: Dr. Fritsche, first mayor of Windhoek
 1910–1911: Gustav Voigts
 1911–1915: Peter Müller, born 1873, member of the Schutztruppe, later businessman

South African Mandate (1915–1966)
 1915–1916: Peter Müller, 1st time, born 1873, member of the Schutztruppe, later businessman
 191?–1918: Dr. Kohler
 1920–1922: Peter Müller, 2nd time, born 1873, member of the Schutztruppe, later businessman
 1927–1928: Joseph Wood, born 17 February 1876 in Birmingham, Warwickshire, England, Great Britain and Ireland, a Wesleyan Church minister.
 1929–1938: John Meinert, born 9 December 1886 in Hamburg, Germany. Businessman and founder of John Meinert Printing Ltd.
 19??–19??: Edgar Sander, born 4 March 1895 in Leipzig, Saxony, Germany, entered Namibia in 1923. Sander farmed with Karakul skins and was a member of the Legislative Assembly of South-West Africa.
 19??–19??: Abraham Bernard May, 1st time, medical doctor and district surgeon
 1941–1946: Marie Elizabeth May Bell, first female mayor of Windhoek
 1950s: Simon Frank, born 11 October 1913 in Robertson, South Africa. Advocate Frank was mayor of Newcastle in KwaZulu-Natal before taking the post in Windhoek.
 1954–1955: Willem Hendrik Immelmann, born 11 February 1904 in Sutherland, Cape Colony, was a manager at Windhoek Universal Motors.
 1956–1957: Hermanus Johannes Steyn, born in 1890 in Ermelo, Transvaal Colony. Steyn was an ophthalmologist and the leader of the National Party of South-West Africa.
 1957–1961: Jaap Snyman (Jacobus van Deventer Snyman), businessman, born 7 February 1919 in Zeerust, South Africa. Snyman was the owner of the car that was set on fire during the Old Location Uprising in December 1959, prompting the police to open fire at the protesters and killing 11 people.
 1961–1963: Stefanus Johannes Spies, born 26 June 1922 in Oudtshoorn, South Africa. He was a businessman and entered Namibia in 1945.
 1963–1965: Jack Levinson
 1965-196?: Sam Davis

South African Occupation (1966–1990)
 1966–1966: Hendrik Petrus Labuschagne (better known as Johann), a business man in the Motor Industry in Windhoek. Born 3 November 1920.
 19??–19??: Dries Yssel
 19??–19??: Joey Olivier
 19??–19??: Petra Hamman, 1st time
 19??–19??: Vivienne Graig-McLaren, 1st time
 1970–1971: Joachim Bernhard Hermann von Prittwitz und Gaffron, mechanical engineer, first Mayor from German nobility
 1974–1976: Günther Kaschik, born 16 January 1930 in Germany, was a businessman and manager of the South-West African Buildings Society
 1988–1990: Abraham Bernard May, 2nd time (1912–1993)

Independent Namibia (1990–present)
 1990–1991: Abraham Bernard May, 2nd time (1912–1993)
 1991–1992: Petra Hamman, 2nd time
 1993–1994: Matheus Shikongo (1950–2021), 1st time, first black Mayor, died from the COVID-19 pandemic in Namibia
 1994–1995: Vivienne Graig-McLaren, 2nd time
 1995–1998: Björn Graf Finck von Finckenstein (1958–2021)
 1999-2000: Immanuel Ngatjizeko
 2000–2010: Matheus Shikongo (1950–2021), 2nd time, died from the COVID-19 pandemic in Namibia, longest-serving mayor of Windhoek
 2010–2012: Elaine Trepper
 2012–2014: Agnes Kafula
 2014–2019: Muesee Kazapua
 2019–2020: Fransina Kahungu
 2020–2021: Job Amupanda
 2021–2023: Sade Gawanas
 2023-present Joseph Uapingene

See also
 Timeline of Windhoek

References

Notes

Literature
 Brenda Bravenboer: Windhoek – Capital of Namibia. Gamsberg-Macmillan, Windhoek 2004.

External links
 Windhoek City Council

 
Mayors of Windhoek